The Waterford Senior Hurling Championship (known for sponsorship reasons as the JJ Kavanagh & Sons Senior Hurling Championship) is an annual hurling competition organised by the Waterford County Board of the Gaelic Athletic Association since 1897 for the top hurling teams in the county of Waterford in Ireland.

The series of games are played during the spring, summer and autumn months with the county final currently being played at Walsh Park in October. Initially played as a knock-out competition, the championship currently features a group stage followed by a knock-out stage. The Waterford County Championship is an integral part of the wider Munster Senior Club Hurling Championship. The winners of the Waterford county final join the champions of the other hurling counties to contest the provincial championship. Twelve teams currently participate in the Waterford County Championship. The title has been won at least once by 23 different teams. The all-time record-holders are Mount Sion, who have won a total of 35 titles. Ballygunner are the title-holders after defeating Passage by 1–23 to 0–09 in the 2020 championship final.

The championship

Format
Group stage: The 12 teams are divided into two groups. Each team plays each other once. The top four teams in each group advance to the kick-out stage. The fifth-placed teams in each group are eliminated from the championship. The bottom-placed teams in each group contest the relegation play-off.

Relegation play-off: The losers of this game are relegated to the Waterford Intermediate Hurling Championship.

Quarter-finals: 8 teams contest this round. The 4 winning teams advance to the Semi-finals. The 4 losing teams are eliminated from the championship.

Semi-finals: 4 teams contest this round. The 2 winning teams advance to the Semi-finals. The 2 losing teams are eliminated from the championship.

Final: The final is contested by the two semi-final winners.

Participating teams
The following 12 teams contested the 2018 championship:

Managers
Managers in the Waterford Championship are involved in the day-to-day running of the team, including the training, team selection, and sourcing of players. Their influence varies from club-to-club and is related to the individual club committees. The manager is assisted by a team of two or three selectors and a backroom team consisting of various coaches.

Finals listed by year

Roll of honour

Records and statistics

Teams

By decade
The most successful team of each decade, judged by number of Waterford Senior Hurling Championship titles, is as follows:

 1890s: 1 each for Ballytruckle (1897) and Ballydurn (1899)
 1900s: 4 for Clonea (1902-03-05-07)
 1910s: 3 each for T. F. Meaghers (1910-11-12) and Ferrybank (1915-16-19)
 1920s: 3 each for Dungarvan (1920-23-26) and Erin's Own (1927-28-29)
 1930s: 6 for Erin's Own (1930-31-32-33-34-35)
 1940s: 5 for Mount Sion (1940-43-45-48-49)
 1950s: 8 for Mount Sion (1951-53-54-55-56-57-58-59)
 1960s: 6 for Mount Sion (1960-61-63-64-65-69)
 1970s: 5 for Portlaw (1970-71-73-76-77)
 1980s: 4 for Mount Sion (1981-83-86-88)
 1990s: 5 for Ballygunner (1992-95-96-97-99)
 2000s: 5 for Mount Sion (2000-02-03-04-06)
 2010s: 7 for Ballygunner (2011-14-15-16-17-18-19)
 2020s: 3 for Ballygunner (2020-21-22)

Gaps
Top five longest gaps between successive championship titles:

 66 years: Lismore (1925-1991)
 45 years: Clonea (1907-1952)
 44 years: Tallow (1936-1980)
 33 years: Portlaw (1937-1970)
 20 years: Ballyduff Upper (1987-2007)

Top scorers

In finals

References

External links
 Official Waterford Website
 Waterford on Hoganstand
 Waterford Club GAA
 UpTheDeise.com

 
1
Senior hurling county championships
Recurring sporting events established in 1897
1897 establishments in Ireland